The most recent enlargement of the European Union saw Croatia become the European Union's 28th member state on 1 July 2013. The country applied for EU membership in 2003, and the European Commission recommended making it an official candidate in early 2004. Candidate country status was granted to Croatia by the European Council in mid-2004. The entry negotiations, while originally set for March 2005, began in October that year together with the screening process.

The accession process of Croatia was complicated by the insistence of Slovenia, an EU member state, that the two countries' border issues be dealt with prior to Croatia's accession to the EU. Croatian public opinion was generally supportive of the EU accession process, despite occasional spikes in euroscepticism.

Croatia finished accession negotiations on 30 June 2011, and on 9 December 2011, signed the Treaty of Accession. A referendum on EU accession was held in Croatia on 22 January 2012, with 66% of participants voting in favour of joining the Union.  The ratification process was concluded on 21 June 2013, and entry into force and accession of Croatia to the EU took place on 1 July 2013.

The EU was thus at its largest territorial extent from 2013 until 2020, when the United Kingdom left the union.

Accession requirements

Judicial reform and human rights
Accession requirements included: judicial reform to strengthen the independence, accountability, impartiality, professionalism and efficiency of the judiciary; a crackdown on corruption and organised crime (this resulted in the conviction of former Prime Minister Ivo Sanader for taking bribes); strengthen the protection of minorities; settle outstanding refugee return issues; improve the protection of human rights.

Co-operation with the International Criminal Tribunal for the former Yugoslavia
Croatia had to extradite several of its citizens to the International Criminal Tribunal for the Former Yugoslavia (ICTY), a United Nations body, an issue that was often contentious in domestic politics. Croatia's relations with the ICTY had continually been cited by the EU officials as something that required further improvement. Ratification of the EU Stabilisation and Association Agreement with Croatia had been stalled because of this.

The European Council, after its summit of 20 December 2004, set the following 17 March as the date to start entry negotiations, provided that Croatia continued to co-operate fully with the ICTY. On 16 March 2005, the day before talks were to begin, the EU postponed the commencement of negotiations, because the ICTY prosecution assessed the Croatian efforts to capture the fugitive general Ante Gotovina (indicted by the ICTY for war crimes and crimes against humanity, but at large since 2001) as neither timely nor sufficient.

On 7 December 2005, the Spanish police finally arrested Ante Gotovina with the help of the Croatian government on the Spanish island of Tenerife, located in the Canary Islands. He was brought to The Hague to be tried for war crimes. With the arrest of Ante Gotovina this issue was resolved, and entry negotiations began anew, after the certification of ICTY chief prosecutor Carla Del Ponte that Croatia now fully cooperated with the ICTY.

In April 2011, Croatian generals Gotovina and Markač were given extended prison sentences at the ICTY, which was widely perceived as unjust in the Croatian public. This caused a marked increase in opposition to the accession because, in the past, some countries like the Netherlands, conditioned their support for the Croatia's accession process with the continued Croatian co-operation with the ICTY.

On 16 November 2012, the ICTY Appeals Chamber acquitted generals Gotovina and Markač and ordered their immediate release.

Border disagreements

Croatia has had long-standing border issues with Slovenia, especially over the Piran Bay boundary. Between December 2008 and September–October 2009, Slovenia blocked Croatia's EU accession over these border issues. On 6 June 2010, Slovenia voted to accept the ruling of United Nations arbitrators on the dispute, removing this obstacle.

Croatia has border disputes with Serbia, Bosnia and Herzegovina, and Montenegro, but these countries are not European Union members and cannot directly block the accession process. In December 2008, Croatia and Montenegro agreed that the outstanding sea border issue between the two countries should be settled before an international court whose decision would be accepted in advance by the parliaments of the two countries.

Land ownership

Free acquisition of real estate by foreigners is a sensitive issue in Croatia. This matter particularly concerns Italians, especially in Istria. While it has some ties with Italy, the events surrounding World War II, when Istria changed hands between the Kingdom of Italy and the Socialist Federal Republic of Yugoslavia, remain pertinent. Numerous Italian politicians expressed their discontent concerning the inability of Italians to purchase land in Croatia, considering it discriminatory treatment and stating that the issue should be resolved as soon as possible.

Croatia subsequently denied any discrimination, and said that Croatian legislation provided for the same treatment of all EU citizens concerning land ownership. In mid-2006, Croatia and Italy came to an agreement allowing Italian citizens to purchase land in Croatia and Croatian citizens to purchase land in Italy. Other EU members had to resolve similar issues before their accession to the EU. Examples of this include Slovenia, Slovakia, Poland, and especially Malta.

Shipyard privatisation
Croatia was required to stop subsidising its shipbuilding industry, resulting in privatisations, closures and reduced production capacity.

Negotiation progress
Croatia applied for EU membership in 2003, and the European Commission recommended making it an official candidate in early 2004. Candidate country status was granted to Croatia by the European Council (the EU's heads of state and/or government) in mid-2004, but the date for the beginning of entry negotiations, while originally set for March 2005, was put off. In early March 2005, Croatia was formally warned by the EU that its failure to arrest the war crimes suspect Ante Gotovina would jeopardise the country's chances of starting the accession talks, in spite of Croatia insisting it was doing everything it could to find and arrest the fugitive and claiming that Gotovina was no longer in Croatia. In fact, the talks started in October 2005, shortly before Gotovina's arrest in Spain, which occurred in early December that year and was hailed by the EU as an important turning point for the whole region, as it turned "the page from the nationalist past to a European future".

Before the start of negotiations with Croatia, the acquis was divided into 35 chapters, 4 more than the usual 31; the new chapters, previously part of the agricultural policy, are areas expected to be troublesome, as they were with the other applicants. Following the opening of accession negotiations on 3 October 2005, the process of screening 35 acquis chapters with Croatia was completed on 18 October 2006. Between December 2008 and October 2009, Slovenia blocked negotiations in 13 acquis chapters because of a border dispute with Croatia. In September 2009 it was announced that Slovenia would remove restraints on Croatia's negotiations with the EU without prejudice to the international mediation on the border dispute.

Timeline

Date of accession
Originally Croatia had been aiming for a 2007 accession date, which would have broken Slovakia's record of 2.5 years of negotiations to complete the process. However, negotiations turned out to be tougher than expected. On 5 November 2008, the European Commission's annual progress report on Croatia's candidacy was published. Olli Rehn stated that the country should aim to complete accession negotiations by the end of 2009, with membership following by 2011 at the latest. In 2009 it was also reported that Iceland may be fast-tracked into the European Union, and Rehn said that "the EU prefers two countries joining at the same time rather than individually. If Iceland applies shortly and the negotiations are rapid, Croatia and Iceland could join the EU in parallel". The last non-acquis hurdle to membership, the maritime border dispute with Slovenia, was overcome in November 2009.

Croatia ultimately finished its accession negotiations on 30 June 2011, and signed the Treaty of Accession 2011 in Brussels on 9 December 2011; followed by approval of it by a national referendum on 22 January 2012 and completing their ratification process on 4 April 2012. Entry into force and accession of Croatia to the EU took place on 1 July 2013, as all 27 EU members and Croatia have ratified the treaty before this date.

The accession took place at a time of economic difficulty with Croatia in a fifth year of recession with 21% unemployment, and amid the European sovereign-debt crisis.

As Croatia joined the EU, it exited the Central European Free Trade Agreement (CEFTA).

Areas of participation after EU accession
Croatia became a member on 1 July 2013, but some areas of cooperation in the European Union were scheduled to apply to Croatia at a later date. These were:

Passports of the European Union (the Croatian passport still does not follow the EU common passport design with burgundy coloured covers)
 Enlargement of the European Economic Area is a separate process. Since April 2014, Croatia's EEA agreement is being provisionally applied pending ratification by Croatia, all EEA states, and the European Union.
 Croatia has adopted the euro as its national currency in 2023. The Croatian Parliament passed legislation enacting a national framework for transitioning to the euro on 13 May 2022. Starting in September 2022 prices started to be displayed in both euro and kuna; euros became legal tender for all transactions on 1 January 2023; kuna remained in concurrent circulation until 14 January 2023.
 The country joined the Schengen area in 2023. On 1 January 2023, Croatia removed land borders with Slovenia and Hungary.

Free movement of persons and visa policy

Pre-accession entry arrangements for Croatian nationals travelling to EU member states
Before accession to the European Union, Croatia was categorised as an Annex II country, which meant that Croatian citizens could stay in the Schengen Area without a visa for up to 90 days in a 180-day period. Croatian citizens were also able to stay without a visa in Bulgaria, Cyprus, Ireland and Romania for up to 90 days in each country, as well as in the United Kingdom for up to 6 months.

The general rule was that non-EU citizens had to use a passport to enter EU member states. However, there was an exception to the Schengen Agreement rules for Croatian citizens. Based on the pre-Schengen bilateral agreements between Croatia and neighbouring EU countries (Italy, Hungary and Slovenia), Croatian citizens were allowed to cross the border with only a Croatian national identity card (a passport was not obligatory). Many people living near the border crossed it several times a day (some work across the border, or own land on the other side of the border), especially on the border with Slovenia, which was unmarked for centuries as Croatia and Slovenia were both part of the Habsburg Empire (1527–1918) and Yugoslavia (1918–1991). Prior to Croatia's accession to the EU on 1 July 2013, an interim solution, which received permission from the European Commission, was found: every Croatian citizen was allowed to cross the Schengen border into Hungary, Italy or Slovenia with an ID card and a special border card that was issued by Croatian police at border exit control. The police authorities of Hungary, Italy or Slovenia would then stamp the special border card both on entry and exit. Croatian citizens, however, were not allowed to enter any other Schengen Agreement countries without a valid passport, although they were allowed to travel between Hungary, Italy and Slovenia.

These arrangements were discontinued on 1 July 2013 when Croatia became an EU member state. Since then, Croatian citizens have been able to enter any EU member state using only an ID card.

Post-accession access to free movement in other EU member states

On 1 July 2013, Croatian nationals became European Union citizens and acquired the right to move and reside freely in other EU member states, as well as in Iceland, Liechtenstein, Norway and Switzerland. On the same day, 14 EU member states (Bulgaria, Czech Republic, Denmark, Estonia, Finland, Hungary, Ireland, Latvia, Lithuania, Poland, Portugal, Romania, Slovakia and Sweden) allowed Croatian nationals to work without restrictions in their country. However, 13 other EU member states imposed transitional restrictions on Croatian nationals wishing to access their labour markets. Annex V of the Treaty concerning the accession of the Republic of Croatia to the European Union allows member states to apply national measures regulating Croatian nationals’ access to their labour markets for a period of up to five years, and in case of serious disturbance to their labour markets or the threat thereof, and after notifying the Commission, for a further two years (i.e. up to a maximum of seven years in total).

Croatian nationals who on 1 July 2013 had already resided in an EU member state for a continuous period of at least 5 years acquired the right of permanent residence (meaning that they could work without any restrictions in their host EU member state), as long as during their continuous residence of 5 years they were a worker, self-employed person, self-sufficient person, student or family member accompanying or joining an EU/EEA/Swiss citizen.

On 1 July 2013, non-EU/EEA/Swiss citizens who were family members of a Croatian national and accompanying or joining him/her also acquired the right to move and reside freely in other EU member states.

On 1 July 2020, restrictions were lifted in the last remaining member state (Austria), giving Croatian citizens right to work in all EU and EEA member states.

Visa policy for third-country nationals

In the run up to accession to the European Union, Croatia aligned its visa policy with that of the European Union. As a result of the new visa regime, some third-country nationals (such as Russian and Turkish nationals) who were previously temporarily exempt from having to obtain a visa to visit Croatia were now subject to a visa requirement. However, to mitigate the effect of the re-imposition of a visa regime on tourist numbers, the Croatian government has introduced a 'facilitated entry of aliens' procedure, exempting travellers who have a Schengen visa or residence permit from having to obtain an additional Croatian visa to visit Croatia until 31 December 2013. In addition, the Croatian government has extended the working hours and capacity of its foreign missions in countries such as Russia and Ukraine to ensure that applications for Croatian visas are processed more efficiently.

Visa requirements for Croatian nationals visiting third countries

Upon Croatia's accession to the European Union on 1 July 2013, several countries and territories outside the European Union aligned the visa requirements imposed on Croatian citizens with those imposed on other EU citizens. For example, on 1 July 2013, Hong Kong extended the visa-free period of stay for Croatian citizens from 14 days to 90 days in line with the visa-free period of stay granted to other EU citizens, whilst New Zealand introduced a 90-day visa exemption for Croatian citizens. It is likely that these countries and territories amended their visa policy for Croatian citizens because of the European Union's visa reciprocity mechanism.

Membership of the Schengen Area
During June 2011 Croatia began with implementation of the projects and reforms required to join the Schengen Area by 2015. By joining the Schengen Area, border checks will be eliminated at the land border with Hungary and Slovenia, as well as at airports and ports for flights and ships to/from Schengen member states, thus facilitating the freer movement of persons between Croatia and the rest of the Schengen Area.

The influx of refugees and migrants from Greece through North Macedonia and Serbia to Croatia and then to current Schengen member states like Slovenia, Austria and Hungary, as part of the 2015 European migrant crisis, led some to question whether there will be the political consensus necessary for further enlargement of the Schengen Area. In September 2015, Hungary threatened to veto Croatia's accession to the Schengen Area after it allowed migrants to transit the country into Hungary. Slovenia has suggested it could veto Croatia's accession to the Schengen Area as a result of its border dispute.

On 8 December 2022, the ministers of justice and home affairs representing their EU countries, called the Justice and Home Affairs Council, which is one of the configurations of the Council of the European Union, made the final decision to admit Croatia to the bloc. This will go in effect on 1 January 2023, which means that checks on persons at internal land and sea borders between Croatia and the other countries in the Schengen area will be lifted. Checks at internal air borders, meaning airports, will be lifted from 26 March 2023, given the need for this to coincide with the dates of IATA summer/winter time schedule. From 1 January 2023 Croatia will also start to issue Schengen visas and will be able to make full use of the Schengen Information System.

Membership of the European Economic Area

Croatia's accession to the EU obliges them to apply for membership in the European Economic Area (EEA).  The Croatian government submitted their application on 13 September 2012, and membership negotiations started 15 March 2013 with the aim to enlarge both the EU and the EEA on the same date, 1 July 2013.  However, this was not achieved.  On 11 April 2014, the EU and its member states (including Croatia), Norway, Iceland and Liechtenstein signed an agreement concerning the accession of Croatia to the EEA. It is yet to be ratified, but is provisionally applied with regards to Croatia. As of November 2022, the agreement has been ratified by 24 out of 31 parties.

Public opinion

Croatian public opinion was divided on EU accession. Opinion polling for the EU referendum showed the population was mostly in favour of joining. Public support ranged from a high of 80% to lows of 26–38%. Political analyst Višeslav Raos cited the economic problems within the EU among the factors: "[Croatians] know that the European Union is not a remedy to all economic and social problems. So the EU itself is in a sort of crisis, and that reflects on Croatia's accession." The government announced an information campaign to reverse the drop in support.

A referendum was held in Croatia on 22 January 2012 on joining the European Union, and the result was 66% approval to join, though the turnout was low at 43.51%.

Impact

See also
 Croatia and the euro
 1973 enlargement of the European Communities
 1981 enlargement of the European Communities
 1986 enlargement of the European Communities
 1995 enlargement of the European Union 
 2004 enlargement of the European Union
 2007 enlargement of the European Union

References

Further reading
 

Tolksdorf, Dominik (April 2013). Croatia on the Verge of Joining the European Union: Outlook after the release of the latest EU monitoring report. Washington, DC: American Institute for Contemporary German Studies.

External links
 Official EU-website concerning enlargement
 BBC News: inside Europe: EU enlargement

2013 in Croatia
2013 in the European Union
Foreign relations of Croatia
Historical enlargements of the European Union
Croatia and the European Union
July 2013 events in Europe
Modern history of Croatia